Zaira Tatiana Nara (born 15 August 1988) is an Argentine model.

Biography
Second daughter of Andrés Nara and Nora Colosimo, Zaira is the junior sister of Wanda Nara, and was ranked 47th in a list of the world's sexiest women published by FHM magazine in 2010. She is of Lebanese descent. She has modelled for brands such as Herbal Essences, McDonald's, Promesse, La Serenísima, Gillette, Pantene and Falabella. She is also a social media influencer with over 4,5 million of followers on Instagram, over 2,5 million on Twitter and over 1,2 million on Facebook. She has also been featured in the cover of the Argentine editions of Cosmopolitan and Women's Health. She also has a personal blog and a personal online business named Zaira Beauty.

Career
Zaira Nara was born in Boulogne Sur Mer, Argentina. She began her career as a child model and professionally in adolescence for the agency Dotto Models, but later in 2008 she left that agency to join Chekka Buenos Aires, the agency of Mauricio Catarain in which she won numerous advertising contracts to be the image of prestigious brands of clothing, lingerie and cosmetics. In 2010 she competed as contestant in the Marcelo Tinelli's show Bailando 2010, being eliminated ninth, and in the same year she became also the host of La Cocina del Show. In 2011 she became the winner of the Balón Rosa de Oro (the Pink Ballon d'Or), an Argentine female prize, and replaced her elder sister Wanda in Bailando 2011 when the latter left the show because of her third pregnancy.

Personal life
On 9 March 2011, after two years of relationship, the Diego Forlán announced on his Twitter page that he and Zaira were engaged to be married: however, in June 2011, this couple announced they were breaking their engagement and Zaira stated «Now what I can say is thank goodness I didn't get married!» after the breakup; from October 2011 to November 2014 she dated Juan Mónaco.

Zaira became engaged to horseback rider Jakob von Plessen in April 2015; they announced Zaira's first pregnancy in October 2015; Zaira and Jakob have a daughter, named Malaika "Mali" von Plessen Nara, born on 1 April 2016. Zaira announced her second pregnancy during her live television program Morfi, todos a la mesa (aired by Telefe) on 15 August 2019; she and Jakob have a son, Viggo Silvestre Barón von Plessen Nara, born on 6 February 2020.

Filmography

Television
 2006 — Música total
 2008 — El último vuelo del día
 2009 — Animérica
 2009/2010 — Justo a tiempo
 2010 — Justo a tiempo España
 2010 — Bailando 2010
 2010 — La Cocina del Show
 2011 — Bailando 2011
 2012 — Tendencia
 2013 — Todos Contentos y bastante locos
 2014/2015 — Tu Mejor Sábado
 2015 — Tu Mejor Domingo
 2016/2017 — Morfi Cafe
 2017/2019 — Morfi, todos a la mesa
 2017 — La Fiesta de Morfi
 2018/2019 — Cortá por Lozano
 2019 — Martín Fierro, alfombra roja

Theater
 2004 — Anacondas para Todos con Xampe Lampe
 2008 — Planeta Show
 2008 — El Libro de la Selva
 2013-2014 — Los locos Grimaldi

References

External links

 
 
 
 
 

1988 births
Living people
Argentine female models
People from Buenos Aires Province
Association footballers' wives and girlfriends
Argentine people of Lebanese descent
21st-century Argentine women
Participants in Argentine reality television series
Bailando por un Sueño (Argentine TV series) participants